Oulton  is a village in the City of Leeds metropolitan borough, West Yorkshire, England, between Leeds and Wakefield.  It is at the junction of the A639 and A642 roads.  Though now adjoining the village of Woodlesford, it was once quite separate.

The village formed part of the Rothwell Urban District until its merger into the City of Leeds Metropolitan District in 1974 and today sits in the Rothwell ward of Leeds City Council. It is also in the Elmet and Rothwell parliamentary constituency.

Oulton Hall was built in 1850 and is now a hotel and conference centre.

Notable and former residents
 Richard Bentley theologian, critic and scholar, who became Master of Trinity College, Cambridge.
 The cricketer and Anglican clergyman Henry Bell was born in Oulton.
 Francis Ingram slave trader and privateer.

Location grid

See also
Oulton Academy
Listed buildings in Rothwell, West Yorkshire

References

External links

Area website
Big Red Curtain Performing Arts Incorporating TheatreWorks - Part-Time Performing Arts School based in Oulton
 The Ancient Parish of Rothwell at GENUKI - Oulton was in this parish
The story of Woodlesford station

Further reading
Leeds City Council 2010 Oulton Conservation Area Appraisal and Management Plan

Places in Leeds
Villages in West Yorkshire
Rothwell, West Yorkshire